Let's Work Together: The Best of Canned Heat is a compilation album by Canned Heat, released in 1989. All of the songs are taken from the first five albums released on Liberty Records between 1966 and 1970, except for "Rockin' with the King", which is from the United Artists Records album Historical Figures and Ancient Heads (1971). 

Various reissues on compact disc include extra tracks. The compilation was superseded in 1994 by the two CD set Uncanned! The Best of Canned Heat on Liberty/EMI Records.

In 2001, a three CD set with the same title was released in Europe with gray market/bootleg recordings of early demos and live material.

Track listing
Side one
"On the Road Again" – 3:25
"Bullfrog Blues" – 2:17
"Rollin' and Tumblin'" – 3:06
"Amphetamine Annie" – 3:31
"Fried Hockey Boogie" – 11:05
"Sic 'em Pigs" – 2:35
"Poor Moon" – 2:40

Side two
"Let's Work Together" – 2:48
"Going Up the Country" – 2:50
"Boogie Music" – 2:59
"Same All Over" – 2:48
"Time Was" – 3:19
"Sugar Bee" – 2:37
"Rockin' with the King" – 3:16
"That's Alright Mama" – 4:16
"My Time Ain't Long" – 3:47

Personnel
 Bob Hite – lead vocals 
 Alan Wilson – rhythm and slide guitar, harmonica, vocals 
 Henry Vestine – lead guitar
 Larry Taylor – bass guitar
 Adolfo de la Parra – drums
 Frank Cook – drums on tracks without de la Parra
 Harvey Mandel – lead guitar on tracks without Vestine
 Antonio de la Barreda - bass on "Rockin' With the King"
 Little Richard – piano, vocals on "Rockin' With the King"
 Clifford Solomon – saxophone on "Rockin' With the King"

References

1989 compilation albums
Canned Heat albums
Atlantic Records compilation albums